Michael Parks could refer to: 

Michael Parks (1940–2017), American actor and singer
Michael Parks (ice hockey) (born 1992), American hockey player
Michael Parks (reporter) (1943–2022}, American journalist

See also
Michael Parkes (born 1944), American-born artist living in Spain
Mike Parkes (1931–1977), British racing driver
Michael Park (disambiguation)